Remember Two Things is an album by the Dave Matthews Band, released independently on the band's Bama Rags label on November 9, 1993. This is the only release that lists the name of the group as "The Dave Matthews Band" although the article was removed in later pressings. It was reissued by RCA Records on June 24, 1997, and was certified platinum by the RIAA in 2002. The album cover art is an autostereogram that, when focused on correctly, shows a person's hand displaying a peace sign. It was created by two former UVA students in Charlottesville: Rick Kwiatkowski and Jeff Smith. The general consensus among Dave Matthews Band fan websites is that the two things referred to in the title are "love your mother" and "leave only footprints" as well as the two fingers displayed in the aforementioned cover.

Track listing
All songs written by David J. Matthews.

Following "Christmas Song" is a hidden track with an outro to "Seek Up," followed by the ambient sounds of a thunderstorm and crickets.

Bonus tracks (2014 reissue)

Song notes

"The Song That Jane Likes" is named after Matthews' younger sister. In concert, he often prefaces the song by saying, "I've got a little sister named Jane. This is the song that Jane likes."

All songs are live recordings except for "Minarets" and "Seek Up," which were recorded in-studio. "I'll Back You Up" and "Christmas Song" are acoustic performance by Matthews and Tim Reynolds; all other songs feature the entire band. Matthews has been cited as saying that "I'll Back You Up" was recorded in a closet near a bathroom, and the version on the album is the one "with no flushing sounds in it."

"Ants Marching" and "Tripping Billies" were recorded at The Muse in Nantucket, Massachusetts, on August 17, 1993. "Recently" was recorded at The Flood Zone in Richmond, Virginia on August 10, 1993.

"Ants Marching" and "Satellite" later appeared on the 1994 album Under the Table and Dreaming, while "Tripping Billies" appeared on its 1996 follow-up, Crash.

Personnel
Dave Matthews Band
Carter Beauford – percussion, vocals
Stefan Lessard – bass guitar
David Matthews – guitar, vocals
LeRoi Moore – woodwinds, vocals
Boyd Tinsley – violin, vocals

Additional musicians
Greg Howard – Chapman Stick, synthesizer, and percussion samples on "Minarets"
Tim Reynolds – guitars on "Minarets", "Seek Up", "I'll Back You Up", and "Christmas Song"

References

1993 debut albums
Albums produced by John Alagía
Dave Matthews Band live albums
1993 live albums
Self-released albums